Goalball at the 2020 Summer Paralympics was held in the Makuhari Messe in Tokyo. The event was held from 25 August to 3 September 2021.

The 2020 Summer Olympic and Paralympic Games were postponed to 2021 due to the COVID-19 pandemic. They kept the 2020 name and were held from 24 August to 5 September 2021.

Discussions
On 17 December 2020 the Court of Arbitration for Sport (CAS) decision involving the World Anti-Doping Agency and Russia's participation determined those athletes not implicated in doping or covering up positive tests may still be allowed to compete, but not under the Russian Federation flag.  The Russian women's team, who secured a Paralympic Games position through first place in the women's category of the 2018 World Championships, who may otherwise have competed as a 'neutral team', is known as the 'Russian Paralympic Committee' (RPC).

On the eve of the draw of Wednesday 21 April 2021 to determine which teams are assigned to competition pools, the draw was postponed '[f]ollowing notification of a late withdrawal of one of the women’s teams from the Tokyo 2020 Paralympic Games'.  It was announced on Friday 23 April 2021 (European or American time zone) the International Paralympic Committee by virtue of the Tokyo 2020 Paralympic Games Qualification Regulations, following the withdrawal of the women's team from Algeria, Egypt received the slot.

Qualifying
Both men's and women's tournaments qualified 10 teams each for the Games.

Men

Women

Schedule

Medalists

Notes

References

External links
Results book 

2020 Summer Paralympics events
2020
Goalball in Japan
Paralympics